Justin Alberto Simons Samaniego (born 19 September 1997) is a Panamanian professional footballer who plays as a midfielder for Tauro and the Panama national team.

References

Living people
1997 births
Panamanian footballers
Sportspeople from Panama City
Association football midfielders
Panama youth international footballers
Panama international footballers
San Francisco F.C. players
Tauro F.C. players
2015 CONCACAF U-20 Championship players